Tecamachalco may refer to:

Places
Tecamachalco Municipality, Puebla
Tecamachalco, State of Mexico, a neighborhood in suburban Greater Mexico City

Sports
Tecamachalco, Mexican football club
Teca Huixquilucan, Mexican football club